Films made in Japan produce revenue through various sources; the lists below only consider box office earnings at cinemas, not other sources of income such as merchandising or home video. The lists include both anime and live-action films produced by Japanese studios, but do not include English-language international co-productions between Japanese and Hollywood studios (for example, a number of Hollywood films based on Japanese source material were co‑produced with Japanese production companies).

Highest-grossing Japanese films worldwide 

Due to a lack of available data, some films have incomplete grosses that do not reflect their entire theatrical runs in all markets, and other films are missing altogether. The rankings are consequently only approximate. There is especially a lack of available worldwide box office data for Japanese films released prior to 1997. See Highest-grossing Japanese films in Japan below for more complete data within the domestic Japanese market and Japanese films by number of box office admissions for more data on both domestic and overseas performance, especially for films released prior to 1997.

The highest-grossing Japanese film in terms of box office ticket sales is the 1976 title Kimi yo Fundo no Kawa o Watare (Manhunt), which is estimated to have sold more than  tickets in China and the Soviet Union. Its inflation-adjusted gross revenue in China is estimated to be at least  in 2017. However, the amount of nominal box office gross revenue (not adjusted for inflation) it generated from these territories at the time is not known to have been reported, so it is not included on this list.

The list also does not include ancillary revenue from other sources such as home entertainment or merchandise sales, where a number of Japanese films earn significantly more revenue.

Highest-grossing Japanese films in Japan 

The following is a list of highest-grossing Japanese films in Japan.

Highest-grossing Japanese films by year 
Since 2000, the Japanese box office has been reported in terms of total box office gross receipts. The worldwide gross figures for anime films were also not reported prior to 1997. As such, there are two tables. The first table shows the distributor rentals, gross receipts (if known) and box office admissions in Japan up until 1996, while the second table shows the worldwide gross revenue since 1997.

Worldwide box office data prior to 1997 is sparse, thus the table for worldwide gross figures begins in that year. Movies that have been re-released are listed by their total gross, with their original gross noted in parentheses.

Japanese films by number of box office admissions 

The following table lists known estimated box office ticket sales for various high-grossing Japanese films that have sold more than 10million tickets worldwide.

Note that some of the data are incomplete due to a lack of available admissions data from a number of countries. Therefore, it is not an exhaustive list of all the highest-grossing Japanese films by ticket sales, so no rankings are given.

See also
 List of highest-grossing films in Japan
 Lists of highest-grossing Japanese films

Notes

References 

Highest-grossing
Japanese